Samuel Hind (14 December 1850 – 28 March 1923) was an English cricketer. Hind was a right-handed batsman who bowled left-arm roundarm fast. He was born at Calverton, Nottinghamshire.

Hind made his first-class debut for Nottinghamshire against Kent in 1877 at the St Lawrence Ground, Canterbury. He made four further first-class appearances for the county in that season, before making a final appearance against Kent the following season. In his total of six first-class matches, Hind scored a total of 90 runs at an average of 9.00, with a high score of 22.

He died at Calverton, Nottinghamshire on 28 March 1923. His brother Amos also played first-class cricket.

References

External links

1850 births
1923 deaths
People from Calverton, Nottinghamshire
Cricketers from Nottinghamshire
English cricketers
Nottinghamshire cricketers